Ashinaga is a genus of moths in the family Oecophoridae.

Species
Ashinaga eophthalma (Meyrick, 1931) (previously in Aeolarcha)
Ashinaga longimana Matsumura, 1929

Taxonomy
The genus was previously assigned to its own family, Ashinagaidae. Later, it was assigned to the subfamilies Chimabachinae as well as Stathmopodinae until it was finally placed in the Oecophoridae.

References

Oecophorinae